Normal for Norfolk is a BBC documentary-style reality television programme, created for BBC 2 and following the daily life of eccentric aristocrat farmer Desmond MacCarthy, his family, and his home of Wiveton Hall. Series one aired in 2016, and series two began airing in July 2017.

References

External links
 

2016 British television series debuts
2017 British television series endings
2010s British reality television series
BBC reality television shows
English-language television shows
Television series about families
Television shows set in Norfolk